Gösta Lindh (8 February 1924 – 4 January 1984) was a Swedish association football player won a bronze medal at the 1952 Summer Olympics. Between 1950 and 1954 he played 31 international matches and scored two goals.

References

1924 births
1984 deaths
Swedish footballers
Sweden international footballers
Olympic footballers of Sweden
Footballers at the 1952 Summer Olympics
Olympic bronze medalists for Sweden
Olympic medalists in football
Association football defenders
Medalists at the 1952 Summer Olympics
Sportspeople from Örebro